Martin Philip Caton (born 15 June 1951) is a British Labour Party politician who was the Member of Parliament (MP) for Gower from 1997 to 2015.

Early life and career
Caton was born in Bishop's Stortford and educated at the Newport Free Grammar School near Saffron Walden, the Norfolk School of Agriculture, and the Aberystwyth College of Further Education. From 1974 he worked for 10 years as a research officer with the Welsh Plant Breeding Station at Aberystwyth before becoming a researcher for the member of the European Parliament David Morris. He was elected as a councillor of the Mumbles Community Council (1986–90) and to the Swansea City Council from 1988 until his election in 1997 to parliament.

Political career
He won the safe Labour seat of Gower at the 1997 general election on the retirement of Gareth Wardell. He was elected with a majority of 13,007 and made his maiden speech on 4 June 1997, in which he defended the cockle industry in his constituency.

Caton participated in the rebellion of Labour MPs voting against the government decision to invade Iraq in 2003, and was one of the 88 Labour MPs to vote against replacing the Trident Nuclear Missile System, Caton having been a member of the Campaign for Nuclear Disarmament for years. Within Parliament, he has spent a long time on the Welsh Affairs Select committee and sits with the Socialist Campaign Group of Labour MPs. Martin Caton retired from Parliament at the 2015 General Election.

Personal life 
He married Bethan Evans in 1996 and they have two daughters.

References

External links
Martin Caton MP official site
Martin Caton MP Welsh Labour Party profile

Welsh Labour Party MPs
UK MPs 1997–2001
UK MPs 2001–2005
UK MPs 2005–2010
UK MPs 2010–2015
Councillors in Wales
1951 births
Living people
Politics of Swansea
People from Bishop's Stortford
People educated at Newport Free Grammar School